Carew Hervey Mildmay (2 February 1596 – 1676) was an English politician who sat in the House of Commons  in 1654 and 1656. He fought in the Parliamentary army in the English Civil War.

Mildmay was the second son of William Mildmay, of Moulsham, Essex. He was admitted at Emmanuel College, Cambridge in 1614 and admitted at the Inner Temple in 1616. He was adopted as heir to his uncle Sir Gawen Hervey in 1622 and was directed to take the name of Hervey before Mildmay, this practice being followed thereafter by his family. As a result he inherited the manor house at Marks and became Carew Mildmay of Marks where he lived during the Civil War when he commanded a Parliamentary regiment. At one stage Marks was besieged by royalist forces and he only escaped capture by swimming the moat. He also purchased an interest in part of the park that had been associated with the Royal Palace at Havering when that was broken up and disposed in 1652.

He was appointed Groom of his Majesty's Jewels and Plate on 5 May 1605, his relation Henry Mildmay was Master of the Jewel House.

In 1654, he was elected Member of Parliament for Essex in the First Protectorate Parliament. He was re-elected MP for Essex in the Second Protectorate Parliament. After the Restoration he successfully pleaded to return to his post in the Jewel House.

Mildmay was of Marks, Romford, Essex. He died at the age of 80 and was buried at Romford on 8 August 1676. He had married Dorothy Gerard, sister of Sir Gilbert Gerard, 1st Baronet of Harrow on the Hill.

References

1596 births
1676 deaths
Roundheads
Alumni of Emmanuel College, Cambridge
Members of the Inner Temple
English MPs 1654–1655
English MPs 1656–1658
People from Chelmsford